Nikolskoye is a rural locality (a selo) and the administrative center of Nikolskoye Rural Settlement, Belgorodsky District, Belgorod Oblast, Russia. Population:   There are 139 streets.

Geography 
Nikolskoye is located 25 km southeast of Maysky (the district's administrative centre) by road. Brodok is the nearest rural locality.

References 

Rural localities in Belgorodsky District